Hattie Jacques (born Josephine Edwina Jaques; 1922–1980) was an English actress who appeared in many genres of light entertainment including radio, film, television and stage. Jacques's career spanned from 1939 until her death in 1980. She is best remembered for her appearances in fourteen Carry On films and for her professional partnership with Eric Sykes.

In 1939 Jacques became involved in amateur dramatics, appearing as Doris Gow in Noël Coward's short play Fumed Oak. Five years later, after wartime service as a nurse and a welder, she made her professional theatrical debut at the Players' Theatre in the revue Late Joys, a performance that she repeated on television in 1946. From there she became a regular stage performer, appearing in variety shows and Victorian-style pantomimes.

After her appearances on radio as Sophie Tuckshop alongside Tommy Handley in the final two series of his signature show It's That Man Again, Jacques came to national prominence. She later appeared on Educating Archie as Agatha Dinglebody, where she worked with Tony Hancock; in 1956 she joined Hancock in the cast of the BBC radio show Hancock's Half Hour, playing Griselda Pugh, Hancock's secretary. She made her film debut in an uncredited role in Green for Danger in 1946, before working in a number of minor roles in a series of Dickens adaptations. From 1958 to 1974 she appeared in fourteen Carry On films, where she was "usually cast as formidable hospital matrons (at least four) or man-devouring predators".

Jacques had a long professional partnership with Eric Sykes, with whom she co-starred in two long-running television series, Sykes and a... and Sykes. The couple also produced an album and a single in 1962; a stage show followed between 1976 and 1979, A Hatful of Sykes. Jacques was married to the actor John Le Mesurier in November 1949, but their marriage was dissolved in 1965. Jacques died suddenly in October 1980 from heart failure.

Stage credits

Radio broadcasts

Television

Filmography

Discography

Notes and references
Notes

References

Bibliography

External links
 
 
 
 

Discographies of British artists
Actress filmographies
British filmographies